Parvaaz (Urdu: پرواز, literal English translation: "flight") is the fifth studio album and sixth overall album by the Pakistani band Junoon. It was released in 1999 and features songs mostly based on the poetry of the great Punjabi Sufi poet Bulleh Shah.

Background
The album was recorded and mixed at Abbey Road Studios in London and was hailed by critics as Junoon's finest work to date and was released by EMI and Lips Records. Singles like "Bulleya", "Sajna", "Ghoom" and "Mitti" were a success and did well at the music charts. UNESCO presented Junoon with an award for their achievements towards Peace in South Asia. Junoon was invited to perform at UNESCO's "Music for Peace" concert held in Paris, along with Yesudas, Lionel Richie, Montserrat Caballe, Zubin Mehta and many other great artists from around the world. In London, BBC presented Junoon an award for their contribution towards Asian Culture.

Track listing
All songs composed by Salman Ahmad, except track 6, composed by Ali Azmat.

Personnel

Junoon
 Ali Azmat – vocals 
 Salman Ahmad- lead guitar, backing vocals
Brian O'Connell – bass guitar, backing vocals

Additional musicians
Malcolm Goveas – drums
Ashiq Ali Mir – tabla, dholak

Production 
Produced by Brian O'Connell, John Alec & Salman Ahmad
Recorded & Mixed at Abbey Road Studios in London, United Kingdom
Mastered by Nick Webb
Engineered & Mixed by John Alec

Album Art 
The Album Art was done by Aamir Shah

References

External links
 Junoon Official Website

1999 albums
Junoon (band) albums
Urdu-language albums